Krásno may refer to:

Krásno (Sokolov District), a town in the Czech Republic
Krásno nad Kysucou, a town in Slovakia
Krásno, Partizánske District, a village in Slovakia

See also
Krasno (disambiguation)